The Daily Post is a daily newspaper for the North Wales region of Wales. Its website is branded North Wales Live. The newspaper gained independence from the Liverpool Daily Post in 2003 which later ceased production in December 2013. ABC data from 2021 notes the paper has a circulation of 12,478.

It was based on Vale Road, Llandudno Junction, from 2001 to 2017. In May 2017, it moved to its new and current base at Bryn Eirias on Colwyn Bay's Abergele Road.

References 

Reach plc
Mass media in Wales
Newspapers published in Wales
Daily newspapers published in the United Kingdom
2003 establishments in Wales